The Google Knowledge Graph is a knowledge base from which Google serves relevant information in an infobox beside its search results. This allows the user to see the answer in a glance, as an instant answer. The data is generated automatically from a variety of sources, covering places, people, businesses, and more.

The information covered by Google's Knowledge Graph grew quickly after launch, tripling its size within seven months (covering 570 million entities and 18 billion facts). By mid-2016, Google reported that it held 70 billion facts and answered "roughly one-third" of the 100 billion monthly searches they handled. By May 2020, this had grown to 500 billion facts on 5 billion entities.

There is no official documentation of how the Google Knowledge Graph is implemented.  
According to Google, its information is retrieved from many sources, including the CIA World Factbook and Wikipedia.
It is used to answer direct spoken questions in Google Assistant and Google Home voice queries.  
It has been criticized for providing answers with neither source attribution nor citations.

History 
Google announced its Knowledge Graph on May 16, 2012, as a way to significantly enhance the value of information returned by Google searches. Initially available only in English, it was expanded in December 2012 to Spanish, French, German, Portuguese, Japanese, Russian and Italian.  Bengali support was added in March 2017.

The Knowledge Graph was powered in part by Freebase.

In August 2014, New Scientist reported that Google had launched a Knowledge Vault project. After publication, Google reached out to Search Engine Land to explain that Knowledge Vault was a research report, not an active Google service. Search Engine Land expressed indications that Google was experimenting with "numerous models" for gathering meaning from text.

Google's Knowledge Vault was meant to deal with facts, automatically gathering and merging information from across the Internet into a knowledge base capable of answering direct questions, such as "Where was Madonna born?" In a 2014 report, the Vault was reported to have collected over 1.6 billion facts, 271 million of which were considered "confident facts" deemed to be more than 90% true. It was reported to be different from the Knowledge Graph in that it gathered information automatically instead of relying on crowd-sourced facts compiled by humans.

Criticism

Lack of source attribution 
By May 2016, knowledge boxes were appearing for "roughly one-third" of the 100 billion monthly searches the company processed. Dario Taraborelli, head of research at the Wikimedia Foundation, told The Washington Post that Google's omission of sources in its knowledge boxes "undermines people’s ability to verify information and, ultimately, to develop well-informed opinions". The publication also reported that the boxes are "frequently unattributed", such as a knowledge box on the age of actress Betty White, which is "as unsourced and absolute as if handed down by God".

Declining Wikipedia article readership 
According to The Register in 2014 the display of direct answers in knowledge panels alongside Google search results caused significant readership declines for Wikipedia, from which the panels obtained some of their information. Also in 2014, The Daily Dot noted that "Wikipedia still has no real competitor as far as actual content is concerned. All that's up for grabs are traffic stats. And as a nonprofit, traffic numbers don't equate into revenue in the same way they do for a commercial media site". After the article's publication, a spokesperson for the Wikimedia Foundation, which operates Wikipedia, stated that it "welcomes" the knowledge panel functionality, that it was "looking into" the traffic drops, and that "We've also not noticed a significant drop in search engine referrals. We also have a continuing dialog with staff from Google working on the Knowledge Panel".

In his 2020 book, Dariusz Jemielniak noted that as most Google users do not realize that many answers to their questions that appear in the Knowledge Graph come from Wikipedia, this reduces Wikipedia's popularity, and in turn limited the site's ability to raise new funds and attract new volunteers.

Bias
The algorithm has been criticized for presenting biased or inaccurate information, usually because of sourcing information from websites with high search engine optimization. It had been noted in 2014 that while there was a Knowledge Graph for most major historical or pseudo-historical religious figures such as Moses, Muhammad and Gautama Buddha, there was none for Jesus, the central figure of Christianity. On June 3, 2021, a knowledge box identified Kannada as the ugliest language in India, prompting outrage from the Kannada-language community; the state of Karnataka, where most Kannada speakers live, also threatened to sue Google for damaging the public image of the language. Google promptly changed the featured snippet for the search query and issued a formal apology.

See also 

 DBpedia
 Google Assistant
 Linked data
 Knowledge graph
 Semantic integration
 Semantic network
 Wikidata

References

Google Search
Internet search engines
Knowledge bases
Products introduced in 2012